Alexandre-André Basset (1790 – 22 April 1870) was a 19th-century French writer and playwright. He also wrote under the pseudonyms Alexandre and d'Ornoy.

From May 1845 to May 1848, he was managing director of the Opéra-Comique.

Theatre 

1824: Veuve et Garçon, one-act comédie en vaudeville with Emmanuel Théaulon, and Théodore Pernot de Colombey, Théâtre de l'Ambigu-Comique (14 December)
1829: Le Cousin Frédéric ou la Correspondance, one-act comédie-vaudeville with Étienne Arago and Émile de Rougemont, Théâtre du Vaudeville (7 February)
1831: Heur et Malheur, vaudeville, with Félix-Auguste Duvert and Augustin-Théodore de Lauzanne de Vauroussel, Vaudeville (19 April)
1831: Les Enfants du pasteur, one-act drama mingled with couplets, Théâtre des Nouveautés (9 October)
1832: La Mort du Roi de Rome, one-act drama by d'Ornoy, Théâtre du Panthéon (26 August)

Texts 

 Court aperçu de la question du Monténégro, Dubuisson, Paris, 1855

19th-century French dramatists and playwrights
French theatre managers and producers
1796 births
1870 deaths